The Iona Gaels Men's Soccer Team is a varsity intercollegiate athletic team of Iona College in New Rochelle, New York, United States. The team is a member of the Metro Atlantic Athletic Conference, which is part of the National Collegiate Athletic Association's Division I. The team plays its home games at Mazzella Field in New Rochelle.

Conference tournament champions
Metro Atlantic Athletic Conference Champion 2019

NCAA tournament appearance
2019

Notable alumni
Ignacio Maganto
Franklin Castellanos
Jordan Scarlett
Killian Colombie
Víctor Muñoz

References

External links
 

 
Association football clubs established in 1970
1970 establishments in New York (state)